John Herrick may refer to:
 John Herrick (footballer), Irish football player and manager
 John Herrick (writer), American novelist and nonfiction author
 John J. Herrick, United States Navy officer